is a private university in Takatsuki, Osaka, Japan, established in 2004.

 is a private junior college attached to Aino University. It was established in 1985 and is located in the city of Ibaraki, Osaka.

External links
 Official website 

Educational institutions established in 2004
Private universities and colleges in Japan
Universities and colleges in Osaka Prefecture
Japanese junior colleges
2004 establishments in Japan